Pop-Rock General, in the music industry, is a record chart that ranks the best-performing songs by monitoring radio stations in Venezuela that play predominantly pop and rock music and reported by Record Report.

Chart history

See also
Lead single
List of best-selling singles
List of record charts

References

External links
Current Venezuelan Pop Rock General chart, RecordReport.com.

Pop Rock 2010s
Venezuela Pop Rock